Régine Mahaux (born 1967) is a Belgian photographer known for her portraits of the Trump family.

Biography
Mahaux was born in Liège, Belgium, and now lives in Paris. As a photographer, she first was active in publicity. She now specializes in celebrity pictures, with her work appearing in Vanity Fair and Time. Among her subjects are members of the Belgian royal family, Hollywood actors like Salma Hayek and Robert de Niro, and, since 2006, the Trump family.

Notable works

On 3 April 2017, the White House released Mahaux's official portrait of First Lady Melania Trump.

Notes

Belgian photographers
Belgian women photographers
Artists from Liège
People from Quiévrain
Living people
1967 births